Mardana is a village in the state of Madhya Pradesh located on the banks of the river Narmada in India. The village falls under the Nimar region (pronounced Nimadh/Nimad/Nimarh). The region predominantly speaks the local dialect "Nimadi" and Hindi. Nearest airport is Indore and nearest railway station is Khandwa.

Introduction 
A steep climb from the banks of the river Narmada leads to the village with paved streets, gracious courtyards and cascading bougainvillea. Majority of houses are found to be painted turquoise blue, a traditional Nimar colour. And from the walls of each, the Goddess Narmada looks innocently down.

Mardana is a large village located in Sanawad tehsil of West Nimar district, Madhya Pradesh with total 1014 families residing. The Mardana village has population of 5001 of which 2511 are males while 2490 are females as per Population Census 2011. In Mardana village population of children with age 0-6 is 760 which makes up 15.20% of total population of village. Average Sex Ratio of Mardana village is 992 which is higher than Madhya Pradesh state average of 931. Child Sex Ratio for the Mardana as per census is 949, higher than Madhya Pradesh average of 918.
Mardana village has lower literacy rate compared to Madhya Pradesh. In 2011, literacy rate of Mardana village was 53.53% compared to 69.32% of Madhya Pradesh. In Mardana Male literacy stands at 65.25% while female literacy rate was 41.79%.			

As per constitution of India and Panchyati Raaj Act, Mardana village is administered by a sarpanch (Head of Village) who is an elected representative of village. it is supported by a government school, dispensary, post office and other amenities. Four buses run from the city to Sanawad and Khargone.

History 
According to available ancient Documents, the village Mardana was stablished in the year "Savat 532 Veshakh sudi 3 Thursday, Krishna paksh" by the son of Sardhawaj, Mayurdwaj, caste "Gavli" and subcaste Sakalya. The Mayurdwaj rehabilitated the Tadwi, Golar, Gavli, and Bhil communities and settled in here the Rajput's and Gurjars of Gujrat states and therefore this locality was called as Mardana.

Before year 1903, there was 32 mahaals Kacheri in the Khargone District of Western Nimad. And because of this the Khargone was then, popularly known As Khargone Battishi. The village Mardana was also known, to had one of those mahaals. But afterward the Kashrawad got the mahaal, and the village was added to Kashrawad Town. At that time the population of the Village was very less and the Village had only, a main road, and was known as "Choudhary Patel Ki Gali".

Ruins near the village school indicate that a small fort was constructed in the village. The fort is said to be the capital of Raja Mordhvaj who died at Prayagraj. The ruins show the sinhasana (seat) of Maharaja Mayuradhvaja in a cave. The fort has a hidden ghat (gupt ghat) and a guhavasi Shiva.
The village was also among the sites selected by Malwa queen Rani Ahilyabai to build her capital because of its history and mentions in the vedic puranas. However, her priest advised against it. She later constructed a fortified ghat and temple of Mayuresvara Shiva in the village.
The Village Mardana also Maintained its legacy of Making a Statue of Ravana, and Celebrates the Festive Dussehra with crowd gatherings, from the nearby Villages (Bakawan, Kanapur,Nagawan, Jirbhar, and Katora).

Economy 
The village has an agriculture-based economy. Farming here on the black cotton soil is lucrative, and there are well-heeled and prominent families in the Nimad. From the river, snaking pipes from electric pumpsets run up the bank and penetrate several kilometres inland. Irrigation means that, at any time of year, crops are growing. Common crops grown in the region: wheat, cotton, chillies (mirchi), soyabean, maize, pulses, and sugarcane among others.

Schools 
 Government Higher Secondary School
It is located near the panchayat Bhavan with the beautiful scenarios around, having views of River Narmada and the Ghats. It has all the basic facilities and now there is also higher secondary (10+2) with the 2 subjects Bio and Arts, (Agriculture soon). Many students comes here including villages Bakawan, Nagawan and Malgaon.
 Narmada Vidhya Vihar
This was one of the oldest school in the area. According to the records available at the school, its name was  "Raja Mohardwaj Bal Vidhya Mandir, Mardana" in the year 1991. Later in the year 2000, it got Govt. accreditation, and was renamed as "Narmada Vidhya Vihar Mardana", the first private Govt. accredited school in the village.
The school is co-educational with a school category as primary and upper primary and is operated in a private building donated by a villager. Also the school's management is private unaided.
 Maa Reva Gurukul Shikshan Sansthan 
It's a second private school of the village . It was established in 2005 . It has rapid growth within few years of establishment.

Tourism
The village is known to have 1500 years old Fort of Raja Moharwaj and inside the fort there is man made cave, that opened in east near the Mayureshwar shiva. The condition of the caves is getting deteriorating because of the carelessness of the Govt. and the peoples. 
The village has a "Laxmi Narayan Mandir" which was Constructed by Rani Ahilya Bai. And in the Back of it there is a Khedapati Hanuman Mandir.
The Mardana was known for having a villager as a Darbar of 120 Villages. The Darbar had a huge Mansion in the village, which was stretched across a hectare. But now the mansion is dilapidated. 
The village is known for its Gangour festival, a 100 year old festival of Nimad region. Mardana being the only village in the region, for its traditional Dhaniyer Dance and Playing Cards;it is the central point of Attraction during those days.
Thursday local market is the only source, from which the villagers gets organic vegetables, pulses and other daily items.

Narmada Dam 
Mardana and many villages in the region along the river Narmada will get submerged by the Maheshwar Hydroelectric Project. Resettlement is still under progress. The village came into focus in February 2000 when the "Mardana Declaration" was signed to protest against the dam construction.
In the Year 2001, the New International took the interview of ex-Sarpanch,Kalu Singh Mandloi. And He discusses his concern as, " We in Mardana do not want the dam.I cannot personally believe that dam will come up because the project is such a bad one’ ,Kalu singh is convinced that,in the end authorities will see sense.’ But if it does , the people here are not willing to leave. They would rather drown.
This Land is among the most fertile in the country .Kalu Singh Mandloi asks: "Why destroy it? ‘These people, of Mardana,of Nimad,are farmers. They can only farm, they can do no other thing. There is no land like this for them to go to-the state has admitted it. So what can they do if their village is destroyed? They can drown. That is all". .

References 

Villages in Khargone district